The Albert A-60 was a single engine, two seat, wooden sports monoplane designed and built in France in the early 1930s. Two were built and flown with three different engines.

Design and development

The A-60 was an all-wood, low wing cantilever monoplane. Its wing was in three parts, with a rectangular centre section and two outer, gently straight tapered panels with semi-elliptical tips. These outer panels were mounted with 4° of dihedral and carried ailerons each of  span, occupying most of their trailing edges. The wing was built around two spars and was plywood covered. The A-60's landing gear was of the tailskid type and each independently mounted mainweel was on a robust, rubber sprung, vertical duralumin leg attached to the forward spar of the outer extremities, with a lighter, angled bracing strut to the rear longeron.

Behind the engine the fuselage, all wood like the wings, was rectangular in section and built around four longerons with plywood surfacing; the upper surface was subdivided longitudinally into a ridge with two sloping faces. There were two open cockpits with small windscreens, one centred at about one-third chord and the other over the trailing edge. Disengagable dual control was fitted. The fuselage tapered towards the tail, where the empennage was conventional. Its parallel chord horizontal tail with rounded tips was placed at mid-fuselage height and there was a quadrant shaped fin and curved rudder hinged at the extreme tail, sloping in below to allow elevator movement. Control surfaces were unbalanced.

The A-60 first flew late in 1930. A second aircraft, the A-61 was built with a more powerful, uncowled  Salmson 7Ac seven cylinder radial engine. This made its first flight on 9 September 1931. The A-60 was re-engined with a  Renault 4Pb four cylinder upright inline engine and renamed the A-62. It was flying by September 1931.

The extra power of the two new engines naturally improved performance figures : the A-62 was  faster at maximum speed and  faster cruising and could reach altitudes  higher. Its range, though, was 25% less.

Operational history

Only nineteen days after the first flight of the A-62 it was competing in Le concours national d'avions de tourisme  (The national contest for touring aircraft) along with the A-61,  a Caudron C.232 Luciole and a Guillemin JG-10. Designer Edouard Albert flew the A-61 and Sautereau the A-62. The Guillemain dropped out early and at the end of the initial flying tests the order was Caudron, A-61 and A-62. The final challenge was a  tour but during the first leg on 5 October the A-62 crashed, killing the engineer Paul Breyrich and seriously injuring Sautereau. At the end of the tour, at Orly on 15 October, the Caudron was the winner and the A-61 in second place.

Not much is known about the later career of the A-61 but in 1999 its remains were rediscovered and it is being restored at the Musée Régional de l'Air at the Angers - Loire Airport in Angers.

Variants

A-60 First prototype with  Walter NZ 70 5-cylinder radial engine. First flown late 1930. Later Walter Vega 5-cylinder radial engine .
A-61 Second prototype with  Salmson 7Ac  radial engine.  First flown 9 September 1931.
A-62 First prototype with  Renault 4Pb 4-cylinder upright inline engine. Flying by September 1931.

Specifications (A-60)

References

External links

 Albert Aéronautique Avion Postal A 60 

1920s French sport aircraft
A60
Low-wing aircraft
Single-engined tractor aircraft
Aircraft first flown in 1930